Rajya Sabha elections were held in 1972, to elect members of the Rajya Sabha, Indian Parliament's upper chamber.

Elections
Elections were held in 1972 to elect members from various states.
The list is incomplete.

Members elected
The following members are elected in the elections held in 1972. They are members for the term 1972-78 and retire in year 1978, except in case of the resignation or death before the term.

State - Member - Party

Bye-elections
The following bye elections were held in the year 1972.

State - Member - Party

 OR - K P Singh Deo - OTH ( ele  28/01/1972 term till 1976 )
 AP - Nuthalapati Joseph - INC ( ele  30/03/1972 term till 1974 )
 MH - Saroj Khaparde - INC ( ele  03/04/1972 term till 1974 )
 BH - Bhola Paswan Shastri - INC ( ele  31/05/1972 term till 1976 )
 Assam -  Mahendramohan Chaudhury - INC ( ele  19/06/1956 term till 1974 )
 AP - M R Krishna  - INC ( ele  19/07/1972 term till 1976 )

References

1972 elections in India
1972